D-flat minor is a theoretical key based on D, consisting of the pitches D, E, F, G, A, B, and C. Its key signature has six flats and one double flat. Its relative major is F-flat major, which is usually replaced by E major. Its parallel major is D-flat major. Its direct enharmonic equivalent, C-sharp minor, is normally used.

The D-flat natural minor scale is:

Changes needed for the melodic and harmonic versions of the scale are written in with accidentals as necessary. The D-flat harmonic minor and melodic minor scales are:

D-flat minor is usually notated as the enharmonic key of C-sharp minor, as in the second and third measures of Amy Beach's Canticle of the Sun. However, unusually, two of Verdi's most well-known operas, La traviata and Rigoletto, both end in D-flat minor (although written with the five-flat key signature of the parallel major). Mahler's thematic motif "der kleine Appell" ("call to order") from his Fourth and Fifth Symphonies uses both notations: in his Symphony No. 4 (first movement) it is in D-flat minor, but in his Symphony No. 5 it is in C-sharp minor. In the Adagio of his Symphony No. 9, a solo bassoon interpolation following the main theme appears first in D-flat minor, returning twice more notated in C-sharp minor. Likewise, in the Adagio of Bruckner's Symphony No. 8, phrases that are tonally in D-flat minor are notated as C-sharp minor.

References

Musical keys
Minor scales